Toad River/Mile 422 (Alaska Highway) Airport  is located adjacent to Toad River, British Columbia, Canada.

References

External links
Page about this airport on COPA's Places to Fly airport directory

Registered aerodromes in British Columbia
Northern Rockies Regional Municipality